Jean Schlumberger may refer to:
 Jean Schlumberger (writer)
 Jean Schlumberger (jewelry designer)